L'Hôpital-sous-Rochefort (literally L'Hôpital under Rochefort) is a commune in the Loire department in central France.

Population

See also
Communes of the Loire department

References

Communes of Loire (department)